The World Trade Center Taichung (WTC Taichung) is a World Trade Center in Xitun District, Taichung, Taiwan.

History
WTC Taichung was established in 1988 by the Importers and Exporters Association of Taichung, Industrial Association of Taichung, Taichung Chamber of Commerce, Importers and Exporters Association of Taiwan, Taichung City Government, Taichung City Council and China External Trade Development Council. At the 1990 World Trade Centers Association (WTCA) General Assembly in São Paulo, Brazil, WTC Taichung became the second WTC in Taiwan after Taipei World Trade Center to join WTCA.

Architecture
The convention center consists of two exhibition hall. The first exhibition hall is capable of accommodating 95 booths and the second exhibition hall is capable of accommodating 151 booths.

See also
 List of tourist attractions in Taiwan

References

External links

 

1988 establishments in Taiwan
Convention centers in Taichung
Event venues established in 1988
World Trade Centers